Yoon Pyeong-guk (born 8 February 1992) is a South Korean footballer who plays for Pohang Steelers.

References

External links 
 

1992 births
Living people
South Korean footballers
K League 1 players
K League 2 players
Gimcheon Sangmu FC players
Incheon United FC players
Gwangju FC players
Pohang Steelers players
Association football goalkeepers